Johann Georg Bodmer (6 December 1786 – 29 May 1864) was a prolific Swiss inventor, making contributions to areas ranging from weaponry to steam engines, textile manufacture (machinery for wool spinning), and railroad construction.

See also
Benjamin Hick
Benet Woodcroft
List of early locomotives of the London Brighton and South Coast Railway

References

External links
 Polly Model Engineering Ltd, Anthony Mount Models, Bodmer’s Sliding Cylinder Engine 1841

1786 births
19th-century Swiss inventors
Swiss railway mechanical engineers
Swiss railway pioneers
Swiss military engineers
Steam engine engineers
Machine tool builders
People from Zürich
People of the Industrial Revolution
19th-century Swiss engineers
1864 deaths
19th-century Swiss military personnel